This is a list of rivers that are in whole or partly in Nunavut, Canada:

By watershed

Arctic watershed
Beaufort Sea
Great Bear Lake (Northwest Territories)
Bloody River
Dease River
Horton River
Viscount Melville Sound
Nanook River (Victoria Island)
Amundsen Gulf
Hornaday River
Roscoe River
Croker River
Harding River
Kagloryuak River (Victoria Island)
Dolphin and Union Strait
Hoppner River
Coronation Gulf
Rae River
Richardson River
Coppermine River
Asiak River
Tree River
Hood River
Kugaryuak River
James River
Burnside River
Mara River
Western River
Napaaktoktok River
Dease Strait
Ekalluk River
Hargrave River
Queen Maud Gulf
Ellice River
Perry River (Kuukyuak)
Armark River
Simpson River
McNaughton River
Kaleet River
Rasmussen Basin
Back River
Bullen River
Consul River
Baillie River
Castor and Pollux River
Hayes River
Murchison River
Gulf of Boothia
Arrowsmith River
Kellett River
Curtis River
Sverdrup Channel
Wolf River
Parry Channel
Bacon River

Atlantic watershed
Hudson Bay
Thlewiaza River
Tha-anne River
McConnell River
Wilson River
Kazan River
Kunwak River
Thelon River
Dubawnt River
Tammarvi River
Quoich River
Lorillard River
Ferguson River
Boas River (Southampton Island)
Sutton River (Southampton Island)
Ford River (Southampton Island)
Copperneedle River
Maguse River
Little Partridge River
Roes Welcome Sound
Borden River
Gordon River
Snowbank River
Baffin Bay (Baffin Island)
Clyde River
Jungersen River
Kogalu River
McKeond River
Foxe Basin
Aua River
Barrow River
Cleveland River (Southampton Island)
Gifford River (Baffin Island)
Rowley River (Baffin Island)
Isortog River (Baffin Island)
Hantzsch River (Baffin Island)
Koukdjuak River (Baffin Island)
Isurtuq River
Hone River
Aukpar River (Baffin Island)
Mary River
Hudson Strait
Soper River
Nares Strait
Lake Hazen
Turnabout River
Ruggles River

Alphabetical 

Amundsen Gulf
Armark River
Arrowsmith River
Asiak River
Aua River
Aukpar River
Back River
Bacon River
Baffin Bay
Baillie River
Barrow River
Bloody River
Boas River
Borden River
Bullen River
Burnside River
Castor and Pollux River
Cleveland River
Clyde River
Consul River
Coppermine River
Copperneedle River
Coronation Gulf
Croker River
Curtis River
Dease River
Dease Strait
Dolphin and Union Strait
Dubawnt River
Ekalluk River
Ellice River
Ferguson River
Ford River
Foxe Basin
Gifford River
Gordon River
Gulf of Boothia
Hantzsch River
Harding River
Hargrave River
Hayes River
Hone River
Hood River
Hoppner River
Hornaday River
Horton River
Hudson Strait
Isortog River
Isurtuq River
James River
Jungersen River
Kagloryuak River
Kaleet River
Kazan River
Kellett River
Kogalu River
Koukdjuak River
Kugaryuak River
Kunwak River
Lake Hazen
Little Partridge River
Lorillard River
Maguse River
Mara River
Mary River
McConnell River
McKeond River
McNaughton River
Murchison River
Nanook River
Napaaktoktok River
Nares Strait
Parry Channel
Perry River (Kuukyuak)
Queen Maud Gulf
Quoich River
Rae River
Rasmussen Basin
Richardson River
Roes Welcome Sound
Roscoe River
Rowley River
Ruggles River
Simpson River
Snowbank River
Soper River
Sutton River
Sverdrup Channel
Tammarvi River
Tha-anne River
Thelon River
Thlewiaza River
Tree River
Turnabout River
Viscount Melville Sound
Western River
Wilson River
Wolf River

See also 
List of rivers of Canada

Nunavut

River